Giulia Donato (born 26 September 1992) is an Italian professional racing cyclist.

Major results
2012
3rd Team Pursuit, UEC European U23 Track Championships (with Elena Cecchini, Maria Giulia Confalonieri and Chiara Vannucci)

See also
 BePink-La Classica

References

External links

1992 births
Living people
Italian female cyclists
Place of birth missing (living people)
21st-century Italian women